Rathika Sitsabaiesan (born December 23, 1981) is a Canadian former politician who was the member of Parliament (MP) for Scarborough—Rouge River from 2011 to 2015 as a member of the New Democratic Party (NDP). Sitsabaiesan is the first Tamil to be elected to the House of Commons.

Early life

Rathika Sitsabaiesan was born in Jaffna, Sri Lanka on December 23, 1981. She has three elder sisters. Sitsabaiesan and her family emigrated to Canada when she was five.

Sitsabaiesan grew up in Mississauga, west of Toronto. When her father was disabled following a workplace accident, her mother had to give up her nursing studies to work in a warehouse to support the family. Sitsabaiesan attended the University of Toronto for two years. While there, she served as Vice President of the Tamil Students Association. She transferred to Carleton University, where she obtained a Bachelor of Commerce degree. Sitsabaiesan served as Operations Manager of the Rideau River Residence Association, Vice President of the Carleton University Students' Association, and Caucus Chair of the New University Government. She also worked for the University of Toronto Students' Union and the Ontario Labour Relations Board. She holds a Master's degree in Industrial Relations at Queen's University.

Sitsabaiesan is a member of the Board of Directors of the Malvern Community Coalition, a residents' group in Malvern, Toronto.

Political career
Sitsabaiesan worked as a volunteer in Ed Broadbent's campaign for the 2004 federal election. She has served in various roles in the New Democratic Party (NDP), including campaign manager during the 2008 Canadian federal election and acting as an advisor to NDP leader Jack Layton on Tamil issues.

In December 2009 Sitsabaiesan won the nomination to be the NDP's candidate in the Scarborough—Rouge River electoral district in Toronto. Layton made his final campaign stop at Sitsabaiesan's campaign rally a day before the 2011 federal election with his wife and fellow NDP MP Olivia Chow. Scarborough—Rouge River was considered a safe Liberal seat that had been held by Derek Lee (who did not run for re-election in 2011) since its creation 1988.  Sitsabaiesan won the 2011 Canadian federal election after securing 18,935 votes (40.62%). Sitsabaiesan became the first Tamil Canadian to be elected to the House of Commons of Canada, the first female Member of Parliament to represent Scarborough-Rouge River, and only the second Tamil woman to be elected to any federal parliament outside India or Sri Lanka, the first being Singaporean Member of Parliament Indranee Rajah.

Sitsabaiesan was subsequently appointed critic for Post-Secondary Education (Human Resources and Skills Development) in the Official Opposition Shadow Cabinet in the 41st Canadian Parliament.

Following the 2012 federal electoral boundaries redistribution Scarborough—Rouge River was split into two with largest share, 71%, going to Scarborough North with the remaining 29% going to Scarborough—Rouge Park. Sitsabaiesan contested the 2015 federal election in Scarborough North but in the nationwide Liberal landslide she trailed in third with 8,648 votes (22.07%).

On April 21, 2016, it was reported she was seeking the Ontario Liberal Party nomination for the vacant provincial Scarborough—Rouge River seat; the seat was previously held by Liberal Bas Balkissoon until he resigned on March 22, 2016. However, her bid for the Liberal nomination was unsuccessful.

Sri Lankan Civil War
Sitsabaiesan said she will take the initiative to form an All Party Parliamentary Committee (APPC) to look into alleged war crimes in Sri Lanka during the last stages of the war. Furthermore, she would prioritize the formation of the APPC to "research and come up with recommendations" for the Canadian government over the report by the UN Experts Panel appointed by United Nations Secretary General Ban Ki-moon. Sitsabaiesan added, "For me the focus is people being treated with fairness, equality, dignity and justice... it is important for the culprits to be identified as a move towards genuine reconciliation.

During a fact finding mission in Sri Lanka, Sitsabaiesan was reportedly put under house arrest in Jaffna on December 31, 2013. This claim has been denied by Sri Lankan Authorities, and the Canadian High Commission has confirmed that she was not put under house arrest nor was any arrest warrant issued against her.

In November 2014 Sitsabaiesan was criticised for comparing Maaveerar Naal, an annual commemoration for dead Liberation Tigers of Tamil Eelam cadres, with Remembrance Day during a speech in the House of Commons.

Awards
Sitsabaiesan is the recipient of The V. K. Krishna Menon Institute's "Personality of the Year Award" in 2012. The award was conferred on her for her untiring efforts on human rights issues in Sri Lanka, opposing the persecution of Tamil minorities in Sri Lanka and her ability to represent her constituency without racial and creed prejudices.

Electoral record

Notes

References

External links

 
 

1981 births
Activists from Toronto
Canadian activists
Canadian people of Sri Lankan Tamil descent
Women members of the House of Commons of Canada
Carleton University alumni
Living people
Members of the House of Commons of Canada from Ontario
New Democratic Party MPs
Politicians from Toronto
Sri Lankan emigrants to Canada
Queen's University at Kingston alumni
Women in Ontario politics
21st-century Canadian politicians
21st-century Canadian women politicians
Canadian women activists
Canadian politicians of Sri Lankan descent